Lottchen am Hofe (Lottchen at Court) is a three-act singspiel by the German composer Johann Adam Hiller.

The libretto by Christian Felix Weiße was based on the opéra comique text La caprice amoureux, ou Ninette à la cour by Charles Simon Favart.

Performance history
The opera was first performed in a two-act version at the Rannstädtertor Theater, Leipzig, on 24 April 1767, conducted by the composer.

Roles

Synopsis
The peasant girl Lottchen flirts with Count Astolph to teach her fiancé Jürgen a lesson. She then unites with Countess Emilie to teach both men a lesson.

References

Further reading
Bauman, Thomas (1992), "Lottchen am Hofe" in The New Grove Dictionary of Opera, ed. Stanley Sadie (London)

External links
Libretto (in three acts), 1785

German-language operas
1767 operas
Operas by Johann Adam Hiller
Operas